Maud Gonne MacBride (21 December 1866 – 27 April 1953) was an English-born Irish republican revolutionary, suffragette and actress. Of Anglo-Irish descent, she was won over to Irish nationalism by the plight of people evicted in the Land Wars. She actively agitated for Home Rule and then for the republic declared in 1916. During the 1930s, as a founding member of the Social Credit Party, she promoted the distributive programme of C. H. Douglas. Gonne was well known for being the muse and long-time love interest of Irish poet W. B. Yeats.

Early life
She was born in England at Tongham near Aldershot, Hampshire, as Edith Maud Gonne, the eldest daughter of Captain Thomas Gonne (1835–1886) of the 17th Lancers, and his wife, Edith Frith Gonne, born Cook (1844–1871).  After her mother died while Maud was still a child, her father sent her to a boarding school in France to be educated. "The Gonnes came from County Mayo, but my great-great grandfather was disinherited and sought fortune abroad trading in Spanish wine," she wrote. "My grandfather was head of a prosperous firm with houses in London and Oporto – he destined my father to take charge of the foreign business and had him educated abroad. My father spoke 6 languages but had little taste for business, so he got a commission in the English army; his gift for languages secured for him diplomatic appointments in Austria, the Balkans and Russia, and he was as much at home in Paris as in Dublin."

Early career

Dublin, London and Paris
In 1882, her father, an army officer, was posted to Dublin. She accompanied him and remained with him until his death in 1886. With her sister Kathleen, Gonne spent an unhappy time in London under the guardianship of their uncle William Gonne. Unaware that she would inherit a fortune on her majority, she tried to become an actress, but became ill with the tuberculosis that stayed with her throughout her life; in the summer of 1887 she went to the French spa town of Royat in the Auvergne to recover. 

In France, Gonne met Lucien Millevoye (1850–1918), a married journalist with fervid right-wing politics, a supporter of the revanchist General Boulanger. Her relationship with Millevoye, who was sixteen years her senior, was both sexually and politically driven. With Boulanger he would redeem France by regaining Alsace-Lorraine. Her mission was Ireland, and together they would constitute an alliance against the British Empire.

In December 1887 Maud Gonne inherited trust funds in excess of £13,000 and an unentailed sum from her mother's estate. She was a very wealthy woman and was free to live as she pleased. She travelled early in 1888 on a clandestine Boulangist mission to Russia, where she met the notable Pall Mall Gazette editor W. T. Stead, who wrote of meeting in St Petersburg "one of the most beautiful women of the world" (Review of Reviews, 7 June 1892). She returned to Ireland and worked for the release of Irish political prisoners from jail.

In 1889, she first met W. B. Yeats, who fell in love with her. Gonne was attracted to the occultist and spiritualist worlds deeply important to Yeats, asking his friends about the reality of reincarnation. In 1891 she briefly joined the Hermetic Order of the Golden Dawn, a magical organisation with which Yeats had involved himself.

In 1890, in France she again met Millevoye. They had a son, Georges, but the child died within the year, possibly of meningitis. Gonne was distraught, and buried him in a large memorial chapel. (Her distress remained with her; in her will she asked for Georges's baby shoes to be interred with her).  After the child's death, she separated from Millevoye, but in late 1893 arranged to meet him at the mausoleum in Samois-sur-Seine and, next to their child's sarcophagus, they had sexual intercourse. Her purpose was to conceive a baby with the same father, to whom the soul of Georges would transmigrate in metempsychosis.  Gonne's daughter by Millevoye, Iseult Gonne, was born in August 1894.

Gonne MacBride is known for having had anti-Semitic views. Historian D. G. Boyce described her as "noisily anti-Semitic." The Dictionary of Irish Biography states that she believed in anti-Semitic and anti-Masonic theories.

Inghinidhe na hÉireann
During the 1890s, Gonne travelled extensively throughout England, Wales, Scotland and the United States campaigning for the nationalist cause, forming an organization called the "Irish League" (L'association irlandaise) in 1896. 

In 1900, Gonne helped found Inghinidhe na hÉireann (Daughters of Ireland). Twenty-nine women attended the first meeting.  They decided to "combat in every way English influence doing so much injury to the artistic taste and refinement of the Irish people." 

At the same time, she conceived Inghinidhe na hÉireann as a distinct voice for women in Irish affairs. In an early number of Bean na hÉireann, the organisation's journal, the editorial proclaims, "Our desire to have a voice in directing the affairs of Ireland is not based on the failure of men to do so properly, but is the inherent right of women as loyal citizens and intelligent human souls."

Sinn Féin

In her autobiography, she wrote, "I have always hated war and am by nature and philosophy a pacifist, but it is the English who are forcing war on us, and the first principle of war is to kill the enemy."  

A second organisation, the National Council, was formed in 1903 by Gonne and others, including Arthur Griffith, on the occasion of the visit of King Edward VII to Dublin. Its purpose was to lobby Dublin Corporation to refrain from presenting an address to the king. The motion to present an address was duly defeated, but the National Council remained in existence as a pressure group with the aim of increasing nationalist representation on local councils. 

The first annual convention of the National Council on 28 November 1905 was notable for two things: the decision, by a majority vote (with Griffith dissenting), to open branches and organise on a national basis; and the presentation by Griffith of his 'Hungarian' policy, which was now called the Sinn Féin policy. This meeting is usually taken as the date of the foundation of the Sinn Féin party.

Acting

In 1897, along with Yeats and Griffith, she organised protests against Queen Victoria's Diamond Jubilee.  In April 1902, she took a leading role in Yeats's play Cathleen Ní Houlihan. She portrayed Cathleen, the "old woman of Ireland", who mourns for her four provinces which had been "lost" to the British.  She was already spending much of her time in Paris.

In the same year, she joined the Roman Catholic Church. She refused many marriage proposals from Yeats, not only because he was unwilling to convert to Catholicism and because she viewed him as insufficiently radical in his nationalism, but also because she believed his unrequited love for her had been a boon for his poetry and that the world should thank her for never having accepted his proposals. When Yeats told her he was not happy without her, she replied,

Marriage
In Paris in 1903, after having turned down at least four marriage proposals from Yeats between 1891 and 1901, Maud married Major John MacBride, who had led the Irish Transvaal Brigade against the British in the Second Boer War. The following year their son Seán MacBride was born. 
Afterwards Gonne and her husband agreed to end their marriage.  She demanded sole custody of their son, but MacBride refused, and a divorce case began in Paris on 28 February 1905. The only charge against MacBride substantiated in court was that he had been drunk on one occasion during the marriage. A divorce was not granted, and MacBride was given the right to visit his son twice weekly.

After the marriage ended, Gonne made allegations of domestic violence and, according to W. B. Yeats, of sexual molestation of Iseult, her daughter from a previous relationship, then aged eleven.  Critics have suggested that Yeats may have fabricated his allegations due to his hatred of MacBride over Maud's rejection of him in favour of MacBride.  Neither the divorce papers submitted by Gonne nor Iseult's own writings mention any such incident, which is unsurprising, given the reticence of the times around such matters, but Francis Stuart, Iseult's later husband, attests to Iseult telling him about it. The allegation concerning Iseult was made by Maud to Dr. Anthony MacBride, John's brother. Though Maud omitted it from court proceedings, the MacBride side raised it in court to have John's name cleared. As Maud wrote to Yeats, MacBride succeeded in this. Yeats and some of his biographers have maintained that Iseult was a victim, and have omitted the court incident.

MacBride visited his son as allowed for a short time, but returned to Ireland and never saw him again. Gonne raised the boy in Paris. MacBride was executed in May 1916 along with James Connolly and other leaders of the Easter Rising. After MacBride's death Gonne felt that she could safely return to live permanently in Ireland.

In 1917, Yeats, in his fifties, proposed first to Maud Gonne, who turned him down, and then to the 23-year-old Iseult, who did not accept either.  He had known her since she was four, and often referred to her as his darling child and took a paternal interest in her writings (many Dubliners wrongly suspected that Yeats was her father). Iseult considered the proposal, but finally turned him down, because he was not really in love with her and it would upset her mother too much.

Irish republicanism

Known as the "Irish Joan of Arc", Gonne became known for her Irish republican views on a variety of contemporary social issues in Ireland. During the fin de siècle era, she supported Irish Catholic tenant farmers in their struggles against the Protestant Ascendancy and the Royal Irish Constabulary (RIC) during the Land War. Gonne chaired several meetings of international groups to build sympathy for her causes among the American, British and French publics. During the Second Boer War, Gonne, along with a small group of republicans, supported the Boer republics by giving speeches and publishing newspaper articles advocating against Irish involvement in the war. Gonne became known for her eloquence in her political speeches and they were credited for animating the founding of new Irish nationalist organizations.

In April 1900, Maude wrote an article titled "The Famine Queen" for the United Irishman newspaper on the occasion of a planned visit by Queen Victoria to Ireland. The newspaper was suppressed by the RIC but the article was republished in US newspapers. 

Gonne remained very active in Paris. In 1913, she established L'Irlande libre, a French newspaper.  She wanted Cumann na mBan to be considered seriously: her idea was to get affiliation with the English Red Cross, and wrote to Geneva to gain an international profile for the new nationalist organization.  In 1918, she was arrested in Dublin and imprisoned in England for six months.

She worked with the Irish White Cross for the relief of victims of violence.  Gonne MacBride moved in upper-class circles.  Lord French's sister, Mrs Charlotte Despard was a famous suffragist, who was already a Sinn Feiner when she arrived in Dublin in 1920.  She naturally accompanied Gonne on a tour of County Cork, seat of the most fervent revolutionary activity.  Cork was under a Martial Law Area (MLA) prohibited to Irishmen and women outside the zone but the Viceroy's sister had a pass.

In 1921, she opposed the Treaty and advocated the Republican side. The committee that set up White Cross in Ireland asked Gonne to join in January 1921 to distribute funds to victims administered by Cumann na mBan.  She settled in Dublin in 1922.  During the street battles she headed up a delegation called The Women's Peace Committee which approached the Dáil leadership, and her old friend Arthur Griffith.  But they were unable to stop the indiscriminate shooting of civilians, being more interested in law and order.  In August she set up a similar organization, the Women's Prisoner's Defence League.  The prisons were brutal and many women were locked up in men's prisons.  The League supported families wanting news of inmates.  They worked for prisoners rights, began vigils, and published stories of tragic deaths.  Through her friendship with Despard and opposition to government they were labeled "Mad and Madame Desperate". Historians have related the extent of the damage done to her home at 75 St Stephen's Green, when soldiers from the National Army ransacked the place.  Maud was arrested and taken to Mountjoy Jail.  On 9 November 1922 the Sinn Féin Office was raided in Suffolk street; the Free State had swept the capital, rounding up opposition committing them to prison for internment.  The evidence comes from Margaret Buckley, who as Secretary of Sinn Féin acted as legal representative for the ladies but there was nothing prudish about their concerted opposition to civil rights abuses.

On 10 April 1923, Maud Gonne MacBride was arrested. The charges were: 1) painting banners for seditious demonstrations, and 2) preparing anti-government literature. According to the diary account of her colleague Hannah Moynihan: Last night [10th April] at 11pm, we heard the commotion which usually accompanies the arrival of new prisoners... we pestered the wardress and she told us there were four – Maud Gonne MacBride, her daughter Mrs Iseult Stuart and two lesser lights...  Early this morning... we could see Maud walking majestically past our cell door leading on a leash a funny little lap dog which answered to the name that sounded like Wuzzo – Wuzzo.    She was released on 28 April, after twenty days in custody.  Months later the women spread a rumour that Nell Ryan had died in custody in order to gain a propaganda victory. Women continued to be arrested.  On 1 June Gonne was standing in protest outside Kilmainham Jail with Dorothy Macardle, the writer and activist, and Iseult Stuart.  They were supporting hunger striker Máire Comerford.  Again the source for this story seems to be fellow ex-prisoner Hannah Moynihan.

Other activism
Gonne was a leading figure in the Catholic monetary reform movement in Ireland in the 1930s. Formed in 1932 as the Financial Freedom Federation, they became the Irish Social Credit Party in late 1935 and Gonne MacBride was a prominent member of the group throughout the 1930s. They were committed to reforming Ireland’s financial and economic systems by way of instituting reforms laid out in the inter-war period by the originator of social credit economics, Major C.H. Douglas. In the Irish Independent in 1936, Gonne criticised Ernest Blythe's denunciation of social credit economics. Opening, she wrote; "I read with amazement the report of Mr. Blythe's broadcast attack on Social Credit. Major Douglas's contention that production has outstripped distribution with disastrous results of unemployment and starvation, tending to war and anarchy is incontrovertible, and is apparent to all in the desperate scramble for markets, the restriction of output and destruction in almost every country of consumable goods, while millions of people who need these goods are allowed to starve."

In the 1930s, she was involved in the Friends of Soviet Russia organisation.

Yeats's muse

Many of Yeats's poems are inspired by her, or mention her, such as "This, This Rude Knocking." He wrote the plays The Countess Cathleen and Cathleen ni Houlihan for her. His poem "Aedh wishes for the Cloths of Heaven" ends with a reference to her:

I have spread my dreams under your feet;  Tread softly because you tread on my dreams.

Few poets have celebrated a woman's beauty to the extent Yeats did in his lyric verse about Gonne. From his second book to Last Poems, she became the Rose, Helen of Troy (in No second Troy), the Ledaean Body ("Leda and the Swan" and "Among School Children"), Cathleen Ní Houlihan, Pallas Athene and Deirdre.

Why should I blame her that she filled my days  With misery, or that she  late  Have taught to ignorant men most violent ways  Or hurled the little streets upon the great.  (from 'No second Troy', 1916)

Yeats's 1893 poem "On a Child's Death" is thought to have been inspired by the death of Gonne's son Georges, whom Yeats thought Gonne had adopted. The poem was not published in Yeats's lifetime; scholars say he did not want the poem to be part of his canon, as it is of uneven quality.

Personal
Maud Gonne MacBride published her autobiography in 1938, titled A Servant of the Queen, a reference to both a vision she had of the Irish queen of old, Kathleen Ni Houlihan and an ironic title considering Gonne's Irish Nationalism and rejection of the British monarchy.

Iseult Gonne (1894 – 1954), her daughter with Millevoye, was educated at a Carmelite convent in Laval, France. When she returned to Ireland she was referred to as Maud's niece or cousin rather than daughter. She was to attract the admiration of literary figures including Ezra Pound, Lennox Robinson and Liam O'Flaherty. In 1916, in his fifties, Yeats proposed to the 22-year-old Iseult who refused his advances. Many Dubliners had suspected that Yeats was her father. In 1920, she eloped to London with 17-year-old Irish-Australian Francis Stuart, who became a writer, and the couple later married.

Iseult was not acknowledged as her mother's daughter in Maud Gonne's will when Gonne died in 1953, possibly due to pressure from her half-brother Seán MacBride who did not want to reveal Maud's relation to Millevoye. Iseult died less than a year later from heart disease.

Gonne's son, Seán MacBride (1904-1988) was active in the IRA and in Irish republican politics. As Irish Foreign Minister (1948-1951) he was active the United Nations and helped secure ratification of the European Convention on Human Rights. He was later a founding member of Amnesty International and its Chairman, and he was awarded the Nobel Peace Prize in 1974.

Gonne died in Clonskeagh, aged 86, and is buried in Glasnevin Cemetery, Dublin.

Publications
 A Servant of the Queen Dublin, Golden Eagle Books Ltd. (1995 reprint)

Notes

References

Bibliography
Bendheim, Kim ,(2021) "The Fascination of What's Difficult, A Life of Maud Gonne"
 Cardozo, Nancy, (1979) Maud Gonne London, Victor Gollancz
 Coxhead, Elizabeth,(1985) Daughters of Erin, Gerrard's Cross, Colin Smythe Ltd, p. 19–77.
 Fallon, Charlotte, Republican Hunger Strikers during the Irish Civil War and its Immediate Aftermath, MA Thesis, University College Dublin 1980.
 Fallon, C, 'Civil War Hungerstrikes: Women and Men', Eire, Vol 22, 1987.
 Levenson, Samuel, (1977) Maud Gonne London, Cassell & Co Ltd
 Ward, Margaret, (1990), Maud Gonne California, Pandora.
 Jordan, Anthony J, (2018)  "Maud Gonne's Men" Westport Books

External links

 The National Library of Ireland's exhibition, Yeats: The Life and Works of William Butler Yeats
 
 Collection of information sources on the history of the Gonne family
 Stuart A. Rose Manuscript, Archives, and Rare Book Library, Maud Gonne and W.B. Yeats Papers
 Stuart A. Rose Manuscript, Archives, and Rare Book Library, Maud Gonne Collection

1866 births
1953 deaths
Burials at Glasnevin Cemetery
Converts to Roman Catholicism
English revolutionaries
English Roman Catholics
English stage actresses
Hermetic Order of the Golden Dawn
Irish feminists
Irish revolutionaries
Irish stage actresses
People of the Irish Civil War (Anti-Treaty side)
Maud
People from Tongham
Roman Catholic writers
Maud
Irish people of English descent
Irish autobiographers
19th-century Irish actresses
20th-century Irish actresses
20th-century Irish writers
20th-century Irish women writers
Women autobiographers
Irish women's rights activists
Muses
19th-century English women
20th-century English women
20th-century English people
Cumann na mBan members